Versailles is a hamlet in Cattaraugus County, New York, United States. Versailles has a post office with ZIP code 14168, which opened on September 13, 1837.

Versailles is located on the border of the Cattaraugus Indian Reservation. County Route 42 is the primary highway through Versailles. As with a number of locations in Western New York, it is typically pronounced with a nonstandard pronunciation, such that it rhymes with the word "sales."

References

Hamlets in Cattaraugus County, New York
Hamlets in New York (state)